The Faculty of Sciences at the National Autonomous University of Mexico (UNAM) is the entity where natural and exact science-based majors are taught. It has both undergraduate and graduate studies, some of the former in joint teaching with other faculties, most commonly the Faculty of Engineering. 
The Faculty of Sciences is the most important science school in the country by the number of students and the quality of its research. Together with the research institutes that surround it, it is considered one of the biggest research complexes of the UNAM.

History

The history of this faculty is rather different from that of other schools that have their origins in former national schools. The study plan for this faculty was initially given in the Philosophy Faculty of the UNAM. The Biology major was the first one to have a structured study plan, originating around 1930.

It was not until 1933 that the majors of Physics and Mathematics were founded. Formerly, the faculty was located in a small building between the Faculty of Engineering and Medicine.

Due to the increasing number of students, the Faculty had to construct new buildings, conveniently located among the research science institutes of Mathematics, Biology and Physics.

This faculty, along with Philosophy, is notable for its history of activism during the 1999 strike; these two faculties alone kept the strike going longer than any other school.

Organization & Departments
The faculty is run by the Faculty Dean, currently Catalina Stern.

Has 3 main divisions:
Biology:
 This area covers the bachelor's degree in Biology, Environmental Sciences, and currently researches over Evolutionary Biology, Comparative Biology, Cell Biology and Ecology & Natural Resources
 Physics
 This area is in charge of the bachelor's degree of Physics, Biomedical Physics and Earth Science. Further research is done in the Physics Institute
 Mathematics
This area currently offers bachelor's degrees in Applied Mathematics, Mathematics, Computer Science and Actuarial Science

Location and facilities

The Faculty is located in Ciudad Universitaria in Mexico City, across the street from the Faculty of Engineering and the Faculty of Administration. Its premises are located next to the Physics, Mathematics and Astronomy research institutes.

The Faculty occupies various buildings:  Buildings, "O" and "P", composed only of classrooms, in addition to four other buildings lodging the Faculty's respective departments and their faculty. The newer part of the complex consists of two buildings, one called Amoxcalli, which holds the Faculty's library and the Computing Center. The newest one is called Tlahuizcalpan which hosts various labs and research premises, as well as classrooms.

In recent years, an interdisciplinary extension of the Faculty was inaugurated in the port of Sisal, Yucatán, devoted to the research of coastal ecosystems and their species.

The National Herbarium of Mexico at UNAM in Mexico City houses the largest collection of plant specimens in all of Latin America and is one of the 10 most active herbaria in the world.

Graduate programs

The Faculty of Sciences offers graduate programs on computer science, material science, astronomy, biology, earth science, ocean science, physics, mathematics, statistics & actuarial science, history and philosophy of science and science education, although most of these are run in collaboration with the nearby institutes, like Physics, Mathematics and IIMAS (Institute for applied mathematics and systems). Some programs are offered in conjunction with other faculties and institutes nationwide.

References

External links 
http://www.fciencias.unam.mx/, official website 
National Herbarium of Mexico at UNAM

National Autonomous University of Mexico